WCCP may refer to:

 WCCP-FM, a radio station (105.5 FM) licensed to Clemson, South Carolina, United States
 WAHT, a radio station (1560 AM) licensed to Clemson, South Carolina, United States, which used the call sign WCCP until June 1988 and from March 1989 to June 1997
 Web Cache Communication Protocol